Big Brother 2002 was the fourth season of the Dutch version of Big Brother. Like the third season, the show was broadcast by Yorin again. It lasted from 28 August to 23 December 2002 for a total of 118 days. The presenter was Martijn Krabbé, the son of Jeroen Krabbé, psychologist Dr. Steven Pont as the commentator.

Development
This season the house was again divided into a rich area (the Bungalow) and a poor area (the Bunker).

Unlike season 3, allotment to either side depended on individual tasks, confrontations and dilemmas. As before, some of the housemates were kept in seclusion for a while, this time around in Portugal. All participants were relatively young, and selected upon their single status.

As planned, this led to several relationships from which the one between Arthur and Ursula endured for the longest time. Stefan, working in the porn business, didn't manage to choose between former Jehovah's witness Daniela, Geesje and Margriet. This wasn't very much appreciated by the girls. Dutch Moroccan Mustapha put his stamp on the program by insisting to upheld the Ramadan. Despite that, 'Mushi' was involved in various rude arguments with the emancipated Margriet and fortuynist Arthur. Meanwhile, Judith, Marc, and Wouter provided an ethereal component with their interest in the paranormal and for neurolinguistic thinking.

In the end, the outsider Jeanette became the unlikely winner.

Ratings for the season were low and while Big Brother was still a hit in many countries around the world. At the end of this season, Big Brother was canceled in the Netherlands for the first time.

Housemates

Nominations Table

Notes

External links
 World of Big Brother

2002 Dutch television seasons
04